Musotiminae is a subfamily of the lepidopteran family Crambidae. It was described by Edward Meyrick in 1884

Genera
Aeolopetra 
Albusambia 
Ambia  (= Metathyrida , Metathyridia )
Austromusotima 
Baeoptila 
Barisoa 
Cilaus 
Drosophantis 
Elachypteryx 
Eugauria 
Lygomusotima 
Malleria 
Midilambia 
Musotima  (= Musotina )
Neomusotima 
Neurophyseta  (= Cymoriza , Cymorrhiza , Neurophysetis , Omphaloptera )
Odilla 
Panotima 
Parthenodes 
Siamusotima 
Thysanoidma 
Undulambia  (= Ambia albitesselalis )
Uthinia 
Yoshiyasua  (= Melanochroa )

References

 , 1998: The Scopariinae and Heliothelinae stat. rev. (Lepidoptera: Pyraloidea: Crambidae) of the Oriental Region- a revisional synopsis with descriptions of new species from the Philippines and Sumatra. Nachrichten entomologische Verein Apollo 17 Suppl.: 475–528.
 , 1999: Catalogue of the Oriental Acentropinae (Lepidoptera: Crambidae). Tijdschrift voor Entomologie 142 (1): 125–142. Full article: .

 
Crambidae